Miller Brook may refer to:

Miller Brook (Black River)
Miller Brook (North Branch Mehoopany Creek)

See also
Miller Run
Millers Brook